Haysi is a town in Dickenson County, Virginia, United States. The population was 498 at the 2010 census, up from 186 at the 2000 census, over which time period the town's area tripled.

History

Haysi is located at the confluence of Russell Prater Creek, the McClure River, and the Russell Fork river. The area where Haysi is located used to be known as "The Mouth of McClure". As late as 1911, Haysi was only sparsely populated and was often referred to as a laurel bed.

The first store was constructed within the present town limits of Haysi by Paris Charles for workers of the Yellow Poplar Lumber Company. Haysi began to grow with the construction of the Clinchfield Railroad between 1912 and 1915 as stores sprang up to serve the railroad workers. The railroad was constructed to export natural resources such as timber and coal from the area, and thus later growth of the town centered on workers for the coal mines which began operating around 1916. However, businesses in the town also accommodated travelers, as the rail system was a popular form of transportation at the time, and Haysi was located on a line of the Clinchfield that linked eastern Kentucky with northeast Tennessee, western North Carolina, and South Carolina. Notable early businesses included the McClure Bottling Company, Inc. (established 1914) and the Haysi Supply Company (established 1916). By 1920 Haysi businesses included a hotel, bank, hardware store, and various other retail merchants. By 1930 Main Street was lined with businesses, and the town was incorporated on February 17, 1936.

Local folklore says that in the pioneer days, prior to the establishment of bridges, a ferry boat operator named Si (Silas) shuttled people across the water in that area. It is said that when one arrived at the river and found the ferry on the opposite bank, it was common to shout "Hey Si!" to capture his attention and request passage. Thus, the town which grew around the location of this ferry service became known as "Haysi".

The myth concerning the town's origins is popular and widely accepted among area residents, but local historians dispute this explanation. The name Haysi is said to have originated from a post office established at a general store owned by Charles M. Hayter and Otis L. Sifers. The owners chose Haysi as a blend of their own surnames when it was necessary to provide a name to the U.S. Post Office.

Geography
Haysi is located in northeastern Dickenson County.

Climate
The climate in this area is characterized by relatively high temperatures and evenly distributed precipitation throughout the year.  The Köppen Climate System describes the weather as humid subtropical, and uses the abbreviation Cfa.

Demographics

As of the census of 2000, there were 186 people, 80 households, and 56 families residing in the town. The population density was 210.4 people per square mile (81.6/km2). There were 99 housing units at an average density of 112.0 per square mile (43.4/km2). The racial makeup of the town was 97.85% White, and 2.15% African American.

There were 80 households, out of which 26.3% had children under the age of 18 living with them, 48.8% were married couples living together, 16.3% had a female householder with no husband present, and 30.0% were non-families. 30.0% of all households were made up of individuals, and 17.5% had someone living alone who was 65 years of age or older. The average household size was 2.33 and the average family size was 2.84.

In the town, the population was spread out, with 18.8% under the age of 18, 10.2% from 18 to 24, 24.7% from 25 to 44, 26.9% from 45 to 64, and 19.4% who were 65 years of age or older. The median age was 42 years. For every 100 females, there were 80.6 males. For every 100 females age 18 and over, there were 77.6 males.

The median income for a household in the town was $25,781, and the median income for a family was $31,750. Males had a median income of $25,000 versus $15,625 for females. The per capita income for the town was $13,155. About 3.6% of families and 10.9% of the population were below the poverty line, including 10.3% of those under the age of eighteen and 10.8% of those 65 or over.

Tourist attractions

 Birch Knob
 Breaks Interstate Park
 John W. Flannagan Dam
 Russell Fork River
 The Ralph Stanley Museum
 Veterans Memorial Walk of Honor
 Haysi Kiwanis Park

Education
The Haysi area is served by Ridgeview High School and Sandlick Elementary School in the nearby community of Birchleaf, Virginia.

Infrastructure

Public transportation
Bus service is provided to various locations in Buchanan, Dickenson, Russell, and Tazewell counties by Four County Transit.

References
Citations

Sources
 Sutherland, E. J., Meet Virginia's Baby: A Brief Pictorial History of Dickenson County, Virginia, from Its Formation in 1880 to 1955. A Clintwood, Virginia Diamond Jubilee Publication published in 1955. Reference article: "Other Towns and Villages: Haysi", pages 43–44.
 Sutherland, E. J., Pioneer Recollections of Southwest Virginia. Interviews collected, compiled and edited by E. J. Sutherland beginning in the 1920s and continuing for over 30 years. Collection published by Hetty Swindall Sutherland, Gregory Lynn Vanover, and Joan Short Vanover in 1984. Reference article: "Interview with John. B. Wright", pages 449–451.
 Reedy, Dennis and Diana, Haysi, Virginia: Community and Family History. Self-published in 1998. Reference article: "Haysi-The Early Years", pages 1–6; Reference article: "The Pop Factory", pages 43–45.
 Reedy, Dennis (edited by), Mountain People and Places: Dickenson County, Virginia. Published by Mountain People and Places in 1994. Reference article: "A History of Trammel, Virginia", by Clyde Sutherland and Dennis Reedy, page 259.
 Reedy, Dennis (edited by), School and Community History of Dickenson County, Virginia. Published by Mountain People and Places in 1992. Reference article: "Haysi School and Community History", by E. R. Beverly, pages 182–185.
 Belcher, Anita, Mountain People and Places, Dickenson Star, mid-1990s.

External links
 Town of Haysi official website

Towns in Dickenson County, Virginia
Towns in Virginia